The 32nd Metro Manila Film Festival was held in Manila, Philippines, from December 25, 2006 to January 7, 2007.

Star Cinema's Kasal, Kasali, Kasalo received the top prizes and went home with the most trophies at the 2006 Metro Manila Film Festival during its awarding ceremony at the Aliw Theater in Pasay. The film, which starred real-life couple Judy Ann Santos and Ryan Agoncillo, won some of the major awards including the Second Best Picture, Best Actress for Santos, Best Director for Jose Javier Reyes, Best Supporting Actress for Gina Pareño, Most Gender-Sensitive Film, and the Gatpuno Antonio J. Villegas Cultural Awards among others. In addition, the film's theme song, "Hawak Kamay" composed and sung by Pinoy Dream Academy Grand Star Dreamer Yeng Constantino, won the Best Original Theme Song.
The Best Picture award is received by OctoArts Films and M-Zet Production's third installment of Enteng Kabisote film series entitled Enteng Kabisote 3: Okay Ka, Fairy Ko: The Legend Goes On and On and On.

The Best Actor and Best Supporting Actor awards went to Ligalig'''s actor, producer, and director Cesar Montano and second-time awardee Johnny Delgado respectively.

Other awardees are Shake, Rattle and Roll 8s Nash Aguas for Best Child Performer, Regal Films' Mano Po 5: Gua Ai Di receiving five awards, and CM Films' Ligalig and Violett Films' Tatlong Baraha which received three awards each.

Entries
There were originally ten entries in this year's edition of the annual film festival but OctoArts Films' Short Time backed out at the last minute, leaving the field to just nine. As a result of this, the Executive Committee of MMFFP decided to simultaneously show all the entries on December 25 compared to the past years when some of the films are shown one week after.

Winners and nominees

Awards
Winners are listed first and highlighted in boldface'.

Multiple awards

Ceremony Information

"Best Picture" issue
Octoarts Films and M-Zet Production's Enteng Kabisote 3: Okay Ka, Fairy Ko: The Legend Goes On and On and On was declared the Best Picture after festival organizers changed the criteria for the award by giving more weight to "commercial appeal". As it was the only prize that the film won, the decision to let the film receive it becomes the subject of yet another controversy at the festival. Movie producer Star Cinema made a protest to the MMDA and wrote to then MMFF chairman Bayani Fernando, claiming that the movie Kasal, Kasali, Kasalo'' should have won Best Picture because it topped the final box office.

Box Office gross

References

External links

Metro Manila Film Festival
MMFF
MMFF
MMFF
MMFF